8th VFCC Awards
February 11, 2008

Best Film: 
 No Country for Old Men 

Best Canadian Film: 
 Eastern Promises 
The 8th Vancouver Film Critics Circle Awards, honoring the best in filmmaking in 2007, were given on February 11, 2008.

Winners

International
Best Actor:
Daniel Day-Lewis - There Will Be Blood
Best Actress:
Marion Cotillard - La Vie en Rose (La môme)
Best Director:
Ethan and Joel Coen - No Country for Old Men
Best Film:
No Country for Old Men
Best Foreign Language Film:
4 Months, 3 Weeks and 2 Days • Romania
Best Supporting Actor:
Javier Bardem - No Country for Old Men
Best Supporting Actress:
Tilda Swinton - Michael Clayton

Canadian
Best Actor:
Viggo Mortensen - Eastern Promises
Best Actress:
Elliot Page - The Tracey Fragments
Best British Columbia Film:
American Venus
Best Director:
David Cronenberg - Eastern Promises
Best Film:
Eastern Promises
Best Supporting Actor:
Greg Bryk - Poor Boy's Game
Best Supporting Actress:
Sonja Bennett - Young People Fucking

Notes

References

2007
2007 film awards
2007 in British Columbia
2007 in Canadian cinema